Indonesia national football team results may refer to:

 Dutch East Indies national football team results (1934–49)
 Indonesia national football team results (1950–1979)
 Indonesia national football team results (1980–1999)
 Indonesia national football team results (2000–2009)
 2004 Indonesia national football team results
 2005 Indonesia national football team results
 2006 Indonesia national football team results
 2007 Indonesia national football team results
 2008 Indonesia national football team results
 2009 Indonesia national football team results
 Indonesia national football team results (2010–2019)
 2010 Indonesia national football team results
 2011 Indonesia national football team results
 2012 Indonesia national football team results
 2013 Indonesia national football team results
 2014 Indonesia national football team results
 2015 Indonesia national football team results
 2016 Indonesia national football team results
 2017 Indonesia national football team results
 2018 Indonesia national football team results
 2019 Indonesia national football team results
 Indonesia national football team results (2020–present)
 2020 Indonesia national football team results
 2021 Indonesia national football team results